Walter Wyatt Grave (16 October 1901 – 20 May 1999) was a university administrator at Cambridge University.  He was the first master of Fitzwilliam College.

He was principal of the University College of the West Indies, Jamaica from 1953 to 1958.  He was awarded the CMG in 1958.

References 

1901 births
1999 deaths
Masters of Fitzwilliam College, Cambridge
Heads of the University of the West Indies
Companions of the Order of St Michael and St George
Censors of Fitzwilliam House, Cambridge
Registraries of the University of Cambridge